

Events 
 January–June 
 January – Mehmed III succeeds Murad III, as sultan of the Ottoman Empire.
 January 17 – During the French Wars of Religion, Henry IV of France declares war on Spain.
 April 8 (March 29 O.S.) – Combined Taungoo–Lan Na armies break the rebel Thado Dhamma Yaza's siege of Taungoo, in modern-day Myanmar.
 April 15 – Sir Walter Raleigh travels up the Orinoco River, in search of the fabled city of El Dorado.
 May 18 – The Treaty of Teusina brings to an end the Russo-Swedish War (1590–95).
 May 24 – The Nomenclator of Leiden University Library appears, the first printed catalog of an institutional library.
 May 29 – George Somers and Amyas Preston travel to aid Raleigh's El Dorado expedition but failing to meet him instead raid the Spanish Province of Venezuela 
 June 9 – Battle of Fontaine-Française: Henry IV of France defeats the Spanish, but is nearly killed due to his rashness.

 July–December 
 July 21 – A Spanish expedition led by navigator and explorer Álvaro de Mendaña de Neira makes the first European landing in Polynesia, on the Marquesas Islands.
 July 23 – The Spanish raid Cornwall, England.
 August 23 – Battle of Calugareni: The Wallachians, led by Michael the Brave, accomplish a great tactical victory against a vast army of Turks, led by Sinan Pasha.
 August 28 – Sir Francis Drake and Sir John Hawkins depart from England, on their final voyage to the Spanish Main, which ends in both of their deaths.
 September 2 – Battle of the Lippe (Eighty Years' War): Spanish cavalry, led by Cristóbal de Mondragón (aged over 80), defeat combined forces of the Dutch Republic and England led by Philip of Nassau (who dies of wounds received), on the banks of the river Lippe in Germany.
 October 26 – Battle of Giurgiu: Michael the Brave, led by Transylvanian Prince Sigismund Báthory, again defeats the Turkish army led by Sinan Pasha,  pushing them on the east side of the Danube.
 December 9 – Probable first performance of William Shakespeare's Richard II in London.
 December 14 – Sultan Murad, 4th son of Emperor Akbar of the Mughal Empire invades Ahmednagar Sultanate which is defended by Chand Bibi.

 Date unknown 
 The Austrians incite a rebellion against the Ottomans in Bulgaria.
 The Riksdag of the Estates at Söderköping in Sweden elects the Lutheran Duke Charles as the country's regent, in place of Sigismund III Vasa, King of Poland and Sweden.
 Probable first performance of William Shakespeare's plays Romeo and Juliet and A Midsummer Night's Dream in London.
Many sugar plantations in São Tomé are destroyed by a large slave uprising

Births

January–June
 January 15 – Henry Carey, 2nd Earl of Monmouth, English politician (d. 1661)
 January 22 – George Rudolf of Liegnitz, Polish noble (d. 1653)
 January 23 – Herman Fortunatus, Margrave of Baden-Rodemachern (d. 1665)
 February 9 – Hedwig of Brunswick-Wolfenbüttel, Duchess consort of Pomerania (d. 1650)
 March 19 – Carlo de' Medici, Italian Catholic cardinal (d. 1666)
 March 21 – Ferdinando Ughelli, Italian Cistercian monk and church historian (d. 1670)
 March 23 – Bevil Grenville, English royalist soldier (d. 1643)
 April 5 – John Wilson, English composer (d. 1674)
 April 6
 Henri II d'Orléans, Duke of Longueville, Prince of France (d. 1663)
 Pieter de Molijn, Dutch painter (d. 1661)
 April 12 – Miles Hobart, English politician (d. 1632)
 April 30
 Anne Lykke, Danish noble (d. 1641)
 Henri II de Montmorency, French nobleman and military commander (d. 1632)
 May 1 – Lars Kagg, Swedish count and military Officer (d. 1661)
 May 3 – Aloysius Gottifredi, Italian Jesuit (d. 1652)
 June 9 – King Wladislaus IV of Poland (d. 1648)
 June 10 – Aegidius Gelenius, German heraldist (d. 1656)
 June 13
 John Holles, 2nd Earl of Clare, English politician and Earl (d. 1666)
 Jan Marek Marci, Bohemian physician and scientist (d. 1667)
 June 19 – Guru Har Gobind, the Sixth Sikh Guru (d. 1644)
 June 24 – Ulderico Carpegna, Italian Catholic cardinal (d. 1679)

July–December
 July 1 – Albrycht Stanisław Radziwiłł, Polish nobleman (d. 1656)
 July 3 – John Gurdon, English politician (d. 1679)
 July 4 – Félix Castello, Spanish artist (d. 1651)
 July 9 – Anna Amalia of Baden-Durlach, Regent of Nassau-Saarbrücken (d. 1651)
 July 10 – Charles Drelincourt, French Protestant divine (d. 1669)
 July 31 – Philipp Wolfgang, Count of Hanau-Lichtenberg (d. 1641)
 August 29 – Joachim Ernest, Duke of Schleswig-Holstein-Sonderburg-Plön (1622–1671) (d. 1671)
 August 31 – Georges Fournier, French Jesuit mathematician and geographer (d. 1652)
 October 18 – Lucas van Uden, Dutch painter (d. 1672)
 October 30 – Gaj Singh of Marwar, Raja of Marwar Kingdom (r (d. 1638)
 November 11 – Martin Bauzer, Gorizian Jesuit priest and writer (d. 1668)
 November 13 – George William, Elector of Brandenburg (d. 1640)
 November 18
 Niklaus Dachselhofer, Swiss politician (d. 1670)
 Pietro Desani, Italian painter (d. 1647)
 December 1 – Robert Sidney, 2nd Earl of Leicester, English politician (d. 1677)
 December 3 – Henry Ley, 2nd Earl of Marlborough, English politician (d. 1638)
 December 4 – Jean Chapelain, French poet and critic during the Grand Siècle (d. 1674)
 December 5 – Henry Lawes, English musician and composer (d. 1662)
 December 7 – Injo of Joseon, sixteenth king of the Joseon dynasty in Korea (d. 1649)
 December 11 – Heo Mok, Korean politician, poet and scholar (d. 1682)
 December 14 – Arthur Wilson, English writer (d. 1652)
 December 27 – Bohdan Khmelnytsky, hetman of Ukraine (d. 1657)

Date unknown
 Thomas Carew, English poet (d. 1645)
 Miles Corbet, English Puritan politician (d. 1662)
 Jean Desmarets, French writer (d. 1676)
 Henry Herbert, English official (d. 1673)
 Lars Kagg, Swedish soldier and politician (d. 1661)
 Thomas May, English poet and historian (d. 1650)
 Bartholomaeus Nigrinus, Polish Rosicrucian (d. 1646)
 Pocahontas, Algonquian princess (d. 1617)
 Mikołaj Potocki, Polish politician (d. 1651)
 Robert Sempill the younger, Scottish writer (d. 1663)
 Cornelius Vermuyden, Dutch engineer (d. 1683)

Probable
 Dirck van Baburen, Dutch painter (d. 1624)
 Albrycht Stanisław Radziwiłł, Lithuanian chancellor (d. 1656)

Deaths 

 January 2 – Barbara of Brandenburg, Duchess of Brieg, German princess (b. 1527)
 January 15 – Murad III, Ottoman Sultan (b. 1546)
 January 24 – Ferdinand II, Archduke of Austria, regent of Tyrol and Further Austria (b. 1529)
 February – William Painter, English translator (b. 1540)
 February 20 – Archduke Ernest of Austria, Governor of the Spanish Netherlands (b. 1553)
 February 21 – Robert Southwell, Jesuit priest and poet (b. 1561)
 April 25 – Torquato Tasso, Italian poet (b. 1544)
 May 4 – Hugues Loubenx de Verdalle, Cardinal and 52nd Grandmaster of the Knights Hospitaller (b. 1531)
 May 14 – Wolfgang, Duke of Brunswick-Grubenhagen (b. 1531)
 May 19 – John Frederick II, Duke of Saxony (b. 1529)
 May 25 
 Valens Acidalius, German critic and poet (b. 1567)
 Philip Neri, Italian Roman Catholic priest and saint (b. 1515)
 June 23 – Louis Carrion, Flemish humanist and classical scholar (b. 1547)
 June 26 – Magnus, Duke of Östergötland, Swedish prince (b. 1542)
 July 10 – Udai Singh of Marwar, Ruler of Marwar (b. 1538)
 July 23 – Thoinot Arbeau, French priest and author (b. 1519)
 August 24 – Thomas Digges, English astronomer (b. 1546)
 August 26 – Antonio, Prior of Crato, claimant to the throne of Portugal (b. 1531)
 September 3 – Philip of Nassau, Count of Nassau (b. 1566)
 September 4 – Jeremias II of Constantinople (b. 1530)
 October 15 – Faizi, Indo-Persian poet and scholar (b. 1547)
 October 18 – Álvaro de Mendaña de Neira, Spanish navigator and explorer (b. 1542)
 October 19 – Philip Howard, 20th Earl of Arundel, English nobleman (b. 1537)
 October 23 – Louis Gonzaga, Duke of Nevers, Italian-French dignitary and diplomat (b. 1539)
 November 4 – Francesco Cattani da Diacceto, Bishop of Fiesole (b. 1531)
 November 5 – Luis Barahona de Soto, Spanish poet (b. 1548)
 November 12 – John Hawkins, English shipbuilder and trader (b. 1532)
 November 23 – Clara of Brunswick-Wolfenbüttel, Abbess of Gandersheim and Duchess of Brunswick-Grubenhagen (b. 1532)
 December 11 – Philipe de Croÿ, Duke of Aerschot (b. 1526)
 December 14 – Henry Hastings, 3rd Earl of Huntingdon (b. 1535)
 date unknown
 Grzegorz Branicki, Polish noble (b. 1534)
 Helena Antonia, court dwarf  (b. 1550)
 Turlough Luineach O'Neill, Irish chief of Tyrone (b. c. 1530)
 Robert Sempill, Scottish ballad-writer (b. 1530)
 Thomas Whythorne, English author and musician (b. 1528)

References